Salvatore Aronica (born 20 January 1978) is an Italian football manager and former player who played as a defender, currently in charge as head coach of Eccellenza Sicily amateurs Don Carlo Misilmeri.

Playing career
Aronica spent his early career with Juventus, but he was sent to Crotone on loan. The deal became a co-ownership deal for the 2000–01 and 2001–02 seasons, for €91,000. In June 2002 Aronica returned to Juventus for an undisclosed fee but was loaned to Serie B side Ascoli with an option to purchase. However, the next season he moved to Messina from Juventus along with Luigi Lavecchia and Andrea Gentile in another co-ownership deal. Aronica was valued €1 million at that time, thus Messina purchased half for €500,000. In June 2006, Messina purchased Aronica for an undisclosed fee (around €240,000 to €300,000) and Lavecchia and Gentile outright for free. However, in July 2006 he was sold to Reggina.

He was signed by Napoli on 1 September 2008, for €2,675,000, With the departure of Maurizio Domizzi and Erminio Rullo, Aronica was featured as a left-sided central defender or as a left-sided wingback ahead of Mirko Savini in the team's 3–5–2 formation, sharing the role of the team's left wingback with Luigi Vitale.

In 2010–11 season he started to play with Paolo Cannavaro and Hugo Campagnaro consistently. Although they played well that season, in the following season the squad's lack of depth made it difficult to face both 2011–12 UEFA Champions League and 2011–12 Serie A, making the club slip from a third-place finish in 2010–11 to fifth place in 2011–12.
In May 2012 Aronica renewed his contract (1+1 year).

On 29 December 2012, he moved to Palermo, signing a contract until 2015. His Palermo stay was however difficult from the very beginning, as he did not succeed in helping his club to escape relegation, and was subsequently excluded from the first team for the whole 2013–14 Serie B season, as well as the early part of 2014–15. He mutually rescinded his contract in December 2014.

On 14 January 2015, he returned to Lega Pro side Reggina. After helping the club avoid relegation, he left the team at the end of the season, and briefly joined Calcio Sicilia, before retiring from professional football in 2015.

Coaching career
After retiring, Aronica obtained his Italy Category 2 Coaching License (UEFA A License), which made him eligible to coach youth and Lega Pro teams, or work as an assistant-manager in Serie A and Serie B. In September 2018, it was announced that Aronica would join Trapani as a youth coach. On 15 July 2019, he moved in as Under-17 youth coach for Trapani.

In July 2020 he took over his first coaching role, as manager of Serie D club Savoia. He was sacked on 4 February 2021.

On 19 December 2022, Aronica was unveiled as head coach of Eccellenza Sicily amateurs Don Carlo Misilmeri.

Personal life
On 23 June 2003, Aronica married Caterina Moltrasio. Together they have two children, born in 2004 and 2010.

In May 2007, Aronica was made an honorary citizen of Reggio Calabria after helping the local club Reggina avoid relegation during the 2006–07 Serie A season.

Controversy
On 24 March 2009, Aronica, along with Franco Brienza and Vincenzo Montalbano, was included in the list of players who were accused of conspiring with the Mafia to fix some of Palermo's matches in 2003. Aronica was playing for Ascoli at the time, but was involved in one of the matches which was under investigation, namely Ascoli–Palermo (1–2), from 24 May 2003. In September 2009, however, the case was archived, as the statute of limitations had expired.

In July 2018, Aronica and former Napoli footballers Pepe Reina and Paolo Cannavaro were subject to a hearing by the Italian Football Federation over links to the Esposito brothers, high-ranking members of the Camorra.

References

External links

1978 births
Ascoli Calcio 1898 F.C. players
A.C.R. Messina players
Association football defenders
Italian footballers
Juventus F.C. players
S.S.C. Napoli players
F.C. Crotone players
Living people
Footballers from Palermo
Reggina 1914 players
Serie A players
Serie B players
Palermo F.C. players